Clayton Panga (born 6 July 1985) is a Canadian rugby union player who plays as a flanker for the Prairie Wolf Pack in the Canadian Rugby Championship and previously Canada internationally.

References

1985 births
Living people
Canada international rugby union players
Canadian rugby union players
Prairie Wolf Pack players
Rugby union flankers
Rugby union number eights
Sportspeople from Calgary